The Saanen is a Swiss breed of domestic goat. It takes its name from the Saanental in the Bernese Oberland, in the southern part of the Canton of Bern, in western Switzerland. It is a highly productive dairy goat and is distributed in more than eighty countries worldwide.

History 

The Saanen originates in the historic region of Saanen and in the neighbouring Simmental, both in the Bernese Oberland, in the southern part of the Canton of Bern, in western Switzerland.

It is reported from more than eighty countries. The total world population is reported to be over 900,000 head. Of these, some 14,000 are in Switzerland.

It has since the nineteenth century been exported to many countries of the world, and has given rise to many local sub-breeds, often through cross-breeding with local goats.

A black variant, the Sable Saanen, was recognised as a breed in New Zealand in the 1980s.

Characteristics 

It has white skin and a short white coat; some small pigmented areas may be tolerated. It may be horned or hornless, and tassels may be present. The profile may be straight or somewhat concave; the ears are erect and point upwards and forwards.

Use and management 

The Saanen is the most productive milk goat of Switzerland, which has the most productive milking goats in the world. The milk should have a minimum of 3.2% fat and 2.7% protein.

It is not well suited to extensive management, and is usually raised intensively. Being pale-skinned, it does not tolerate strong sun.

Notes

References 

Goat breeds
Dairy goat breeds
Goat breeds originating in Switzerland